Tape Five is a German musical project founded by a singer-songwriter and Record producer Martin Strathausen in 2003.

Their music represents various styles, such as swing, electro swing, Nu jazz, Latino, Lounge, Dub, Trip hop, and Chillout.

Discography

Albums 

 2003: Avenue du Gare (Vinyl), DigDis
 2006: Swingfood Mood, Europäische Version, DigDis
 2007: Swingfood Mood, Japan Edition, Rambling Records
 2007: Swingfood Mood, US Edition, Watermusic Records
 2007: Bossa for a Coup, ChinChin Records
 2007: Bossa for a Coup, US Edition, Watermusic Records
 2008: Swingfood Mood 2nd edition, DigDis
 2010: Tonight Josephine!, ChinChin Records, Magic Records und Rambling Records
 2012: Swing Patrol, ChinChin Records und Rambling Records
 2014: Bossa for a Coup – Reloaded, Chinchin Records
 2015: Circus Maximus, Chinchin Records (Veröffentlichung 24. April 2015)
2016: The Shanghai Tapes, smarty-mart-records
 2017: Soiree Deluxe, Chinchin Records
2018: Circus Maximus (remixes), smarty-mart-records
2020: The roaring 2020s

EPs and maxi singles (selection) 

 2010: Aerophon Maxi
 2010: Tequila / Tintarella di Luna
 2013: Geraldines Remixes
 2014: Gipsy VIP
 2017: Circus Maximus Aerophon RMX
 2020: Get Down to Luna Park - The Shuffle Mixes, SMARTY-MART-RECORDS
 2021: Vintage FM (EP), SMARTY-MART-RECORDS

References

External links 
 TAPE FIVE retro-modern music
 
https://www.discogs.com/artist/705927-Tape-Five?type=Releases&subtype=Singles-EPs&filter_anv=0

German musical groups
Latin music groups
Dub musical groups
Swing ensembles
Trip hop groups